Saint-Jean-Baptiste Church was a church in Quebec City, Quebec located at 410, rue Saint-Jean.

History
The original church structure was completed in 1847 but was destroyed in the disastrous fire of 1881 which leveled a significant portion of the city. The current church was built in 1884 out of seven types of Italian marble. Designed by architect Joseph-Ferdinand Peachy in the Second Empire style, the church was inspired by the facade of the Église de la Sainte-Trinité in Paris. It features a 240 ft spire, 36 stained-glass windows, and dozens of statues and paintings among other ornate decorations. The Gagnon brothers were both organists at the church; Ernest Gagnon from 1853 to 1864 and Gustave Gagnon from 1864 to 1876. The Archdiocese of Quebec closed this church on Pentecost of 2015.

Interior

References

External links

 Parish site

Roman Catholic churches in Quebec City
Burned buildings and structures in Canada
Rebuilt churches in Canada
Second Empire architecture in Canada
Heritage buildings of Quebec
Roman Catholic churches completed in 1884
19th-century churches in Canada